Sealy may refer to:

Places
 Sealy Tarns, New Zealand
 Sealy Township, Logan County, North Dakota
 Sealy, Texas
 Sealy High School
 Sealy Independent School District

Other uses
 Sealy (surname), a surname (including a list of people with the name)
 Sealy Corporation, a manufacturer of mattresses

See also
 John Sealy Hospital, a hospital in Galveston, Texas
 Seely
 Sealey
 Seeley (disambiguation)
 Sealy Hill, Canadian thoroughbred racehorse